The 2013 South Alabama Jaguars football team represented the University of South Alabama in the 2013 NCAA Division I FBS football season. They were led by fifth-year head coach Joey Jones and played their home games at Ladd–Peebles Stadium in Mobile, Alabama as a member of the Sun Belt Conference. This season marked the first season the Jaguars' were eligible for the Sun Belt championship and to play in a bowl game. They finished the season 6–6, 4–3 in Sun Belt play to finish in a fourth way tie four third place. Despite being bowl eligible, they were not invited to a bowl game.

Schedule

References

South Alabama
South Alabama Jaguars football seasons
South Alabama Jaguars football